Andrew Higgins (1886–1952) was an American shipbuilder.

Andrew or Andy Higgins may also refer to:

People
Andrew Higgins (rugby union) (born 1981), English rugby union player
Andrew Jackson Higgins (judge) (1921–2011), Chief Justice of the Supreme Court of Missouri
Andy Higgins (footballer, born 1960), English football (soccer) player
Andy Higgins (footballer, born 1993), Australian football (soccer) player

Other
USNS Andrew J. Higgins, a US Navy replenishment oiler

See also
Andrew Wiggins (born 1995), Canadian basketball player
Andrew Wiggin (disambiguation)